Spilosoma punctaria is a moth in the family Erebidae. It was described by Caspar Stoll in 1782. It is found in the Russian Far East (Middle Amur, Primorye, southern Kuril Islands), China (Sichuan, Hubei, Guizhou, Shanghai, Zhejiang, Heilongjiang, Jiangsu, Fujian, Yunnan, Dunbei, Jilin, Liaonin, Beijing, Shaanxi, Anhui, Jiangxi, Hunan, Tibet), Korea, Taiwan and Japan.

References

Spilosoma punctaria at BHL

punctaria
Moths of Asia
Taxa named by Caspar Stoll
Moths described in 1782